The Preservation Society of Newport County is a private, non-profit organization based in Newport, Rhode Island.  It is Rhode Island's largest and most-visited cultural organization.  The organization protects the architectural heritage of Newport County, especially the Bellevue Avenue Historic District.  Seven of its 14 historic properties and landscapes are National Historic Landmarks, and most are open to the public.

History 
The Preservation Society of Newport County was founded in 1945 by a group of Newport residents led by Katherine and George Warren to save Hunter House from demolition. They were known as the Georgian Society until they changed their name to the Preservation Society of Newport County.

Gertrude Conaway Vanderbilt, Harold Stirling Vanderbilt's widow, bequeathed $1.25 million to the society upon her death in 1978.

Properties open to the public

Former properties

See also
Antoinette Downing
Katherine Urquhart Warren

References

External links
The Preservation Society of Newport County Official Web Site.
The Preservation Society of Newport County: an introduction from Magazine Antiques, April 1995.

Historical societies in Rhode Island
Landmarks in Rhode Island
Newport County, Rhode Island
Non-profit organizations based in Rhode Island
Organizations established in 1945
Preservation (library and archival science)
Historic preservation organizations in the United States